"Question authority" is a popular slogan often used on bumper stickers, T-shirts and as graffiti. The slogan was popularized by controversial psychologist Timothy Leary, although some people have suggested that the idea behind the slogan can be traced back to the ancient Greek philosopher Socrates. One of the most influential icons in the counterculture movement which formed in the late 1960s out of opposition to the Vietnam War's escalation, Leary gained influence among much of the youth by advocating the use of LSD – which was criminalized in the United States in 1966 –  as a way to escape from the burdens of society.  Following the Watergate Scandal, which resulted in the resignation of US President Richard Nixon and the conviction of several officials in the Nixon administration, the slogan became arguably the most accepted form of ideology among baby boomers. 

It is intended to encourage people to avoid fallacious appeals to authority.  The term has always symbolized the necessity of paying attention to the rules and regulations promulgated by a government unto its citizenry.  However, psychologists have also criticized Leary's method of questioning authority and have argued that it resulted in widespread dysfunctionality.  In their book Question Authority, Think For Yourself, psychologists Beverly Potter and Mark Estren alleged that the practice of Leary's philosophy enhances a person's self-interest and greatly weakens the ability to cooperate with others.

However, Leary's philosophy was foreseen in concept by C. Wright Mills in his 1956 book, The Power Elite.

Mills noted earlier that "It is in this mixed case – as in the intermediate reality of the American today – that manipulation is a prime way of exercising power."

See also 
 Anti-authoritarianism
 Anti-statism
 Anarchism
 Age of Enlightenment
 Libertarianism
 No gods, no masters
 Skepticism

References

Authority
English phrases
1970s
American political catchphrases
Timothy Leary